Regal Cinema is a cinema in Mumbai, India.

Regal Cinema may also refer to:

 Odeon Marble Arch, a.k.a. The Regal, England
 Regal Cinema, Uxbridge, a former cinema building in England
 Regal Cinema, Wakefield, England
 Regal Cinema, Dublin, Ireland
Regal Theatre, Adelaide, a cinema in Adelaide, South Australia

See also
 Regal (disambiguation)

 Regal Cinemas, a US cinema chain
 Regal Cinemas (UK), a former UK cinema chain operated by ABC Cinemas
 Regal Entertainment, a Philippine film and television production company
 Regal Theater (disambiguation)